Luiz Pinguelli Rosa (19 February 1942 – 3 March 2022) was a Brazilian scientist.

Life and career
A nuclear physicist, researcher and professor at the Federal University of Rio de Janeiro, he was also a scientific leader. He was born in Brazil and lived in the city of Rio de Janeiro.

One of Rosa's fields of activity was renewable energy. He was also scientifically and politically active in the field of nuclear energy.

Rosa died on 3 March 2022, at the age of 80.

References

1942 births
2022 deaths
Brazilian nuclear physicists
Brazilian people of Italian descent
Brazilian physicists
Academic staff of the Federal University of Rio de Janeiro
Members of the Brazilian Academy of Sciences
People from Rio de Janeiro (city)